Bobište is the municipality of Leskovac, Serbia. According to the 2002 census, municipality has a population of 1782 people.

Archeological findings of 1400-800 BC Brnjica culture pottery have been unearthed at the Sastanci site.

References

Populated places in Jablanica District